Cot is a surname. Notable people with the surname include:

 Jean-Pierre Cot (born 1937), French professor and judge
 Pierre Cot (1895–1977), French politician
 Pierre Auguste Cot (1837–1883), French painter of the Academic Classicism school